Arquimedez Pozo Ortiz (born August 24, 1973) is a Dominican former professional baseball player. He played parts of three seasons in Major League Baseball (MLB) in the mid-1990s for the Seattle Mariners and Boston Red Sox. He also played one season each in Nippon Professional Baseball and the Korea Baseball Organization. Pozo's primary position was third base, and he occasionally played second base.

Career
Pozo was signed as an undrafted amateur free agent by the Seattle Mariners in August 1990. He spent three years in the Mariners' minor league system, advancing from the Class A Short-Season Bellingham Mariners to the Triple-A Tacoma Rainiers. Pozo made his major league debut on September 12, 1995, with Seattle, hitting a pop out in one at bat; it was his only MLB appearance with the Mariners.

After starting the 1996 season with the Tacoma Rainiers, Pozo was traded to the Boston Red Sox for Jeff Manto in July. Pozo spent the next two seasons splitting time between Boston and the Triple-A Pawtucket Red Sox. In his third game with the Red Sox, on July 28, 1996, he hit a grand slam off of Minnesota Twins relief pitcher Eddie Guardado. In 26 MLB career games, Pozo batted 14-for-74 (.189) with one home run and 14 RBIs.

After spending the entire 1998 season with the Pawtucket Red Sox, Pozo signed with the Yokohama BayStars of the Japanese Central League for 1999. In 91 games with Yokohama, Pozo batted .297 with nine home runs and 30 RBIs.

In 2000, Pozo played for the Haitai Tigers of the Korea Baseball Organization (KBO), batting .213 in 39 games, and the Tigres del México in the Mexican League. He played outfield rather than infield in the Mexican League. Pozo did not play professionally after the 2000 season.

References

Further reading

External links
 
 
 Career statistics and player information from Korea Baseball Organization

1973 births
Living people
Bellingham Mariners players
Boston Red Sox players
Dominican Republic expatriate baseball players in Japan
Dominican Republic expatriate baseball players in Mexico
Dominican Republic expatriate baseball players in South Korea
Dominican Republic expatriate baseball players in the United States
Haitai Tigers players
Jacksonville Suns players
Major League Baseball players from the Dominican Republic
Major League Baseball third basemen
Mexican League baseball left fielders
Mexican League baseball right fielders
Nippon Professional Baseball third basemen
Pawtucket Red Sox players
Riverside Pilots players
San Bernardino Spirit players
Seattle Mariners players
Sportspeople from Santo Domingo
Tacoma Rainiers players
Tigres del México players
Yokohama BayStars players